Cyperus meridionalis is a species of sedge that is native to parts of South America.

See also 
 List of Cyperus species

References 

meridionalis
Plants described in 1938
Flora of Venezuela
Flora of Brazil
Flora of Argentina
Flora of Bolivia
Flora of Colombia
Flora of Uruguay